The Bank of Montreal Building is a former Bank of Montreal branch and a current museum in Sydney, Nova Scotia. It is located at the corner of Charlotte and Dorchester Streets. The building, completed in 1901, was designed by architect Sir Andrew Thomas Taylor, who also designed many buildings at McGill University.

In 2016, the building was donated to the Old Sydney Society, who converted the bank into a museum.

References

External links 
 Former BMO building in Sydney to be renovated into museum - Saltwire

Buildings and structures in the Cape Breton Regional Municipality
Neoclassical architecture in Canada
Historic bank buildings in Canada
Bank of Montreal